Uleoporthe is a genus of fungi in the family Sydowiellaceae. This is a monotypic genus, containing the single species Uleoporthe orbiculata.

References

External links
Uleoporthe at Index Fungorum

Gnomoniaceae
Monotypic Sordariomycetes genera